The Biggest Loser Brunei (season 2): The Spirit of Life is the second season of The Biggest Loser Brunei, which is the Bruneian version of the NBC reality television series The Biggest Loser. This season premiered on October 7, 2011 on BNC Network HD.This season also known as The Spirit of Life because it was the right objective to changes their life forever.

This season featured 18 contestants and divided into 3 teams. This season also introduced the Black Team that be trained by new trainer, Rudy Saleh. Ezuan Aziz and Juliana Mikael still be the trainers among Blue Team and Red Team. This second season hosted by Stacy Sandra and this season also introduced Emma Pangiran Raden as a co-host at Biggest Loser Campus and Arifin Yahya as The Commando.

For this season, Muhammad Zahin have been crowned the title of The Biggest Loser, make it him the second male contestant win this show after Ali on season 1.

Contestants
18 contestants have been divided into 3 teams, Black, Blue and Red. Black Team have been trained by Rudy Saleh, Blue Team have been trained by Ezuan Aziz and Red Team have been trained by Juliana Mikael. However, on week 1, 3 contestants have been sent to Biggest Loser Campus because they have been vote by Team's Biggest Loser. They will be weigh-in on Biggest Loser Campus and they have been trained by The Commando. The 2 contestant that have the highest percentage of weight loss from them returned on ranch on week 6.

On week 7, Stacy told that the contestants will divide into 4 teams, Blue, Red, Black and White. Blue team have been trained by Ezuan, Red team by Juliana, Black team by Rudy and White team by The Commando. Faizal, who win the challenge have a power to determine the new team for the other contestants.

Weigh-Ins

Standings
 Week's Biggest Loser
 Week's Biggest Loser and Immunity
 Immunity (Challenge or Weigh-In)
 Last person eliminated before the finale
 Results from At-Home players
 Results from "Castaways" Weigh-In, taken from Biggest Loser Campus
BMI
 Underweight (less than 18.5 BMI)
 Normal (18.5–24.9 BMI)
 Overweight (25–29.9 BMI)
 Obese Class I (30–34.9 BMI)
 Obese Class II (35–39.9 BMI)
 Obese Class III (greater than 40 BMI)
Winners
 B$250,000 (among the finalists)
 B$100,000 Winner (among the eliminated contestants)

Notes
 Ana returned on week 11 because she had lost 52 pounds on Wildcard challenge. Stacy told that she must lose more than 50 pounds to join the competition.

Total Weight Loss History

Voting History

 Not in house
 Immunity
 Immunity, vote not revealed
 Immunity, was below yellow line or not in elimination, unable to vote
 Below yellow line, unable to vote
 Below red line, automatically eliminated
 Not in elimination, unable to vote
 Unable to vote due Team's biggest loser have a power to vote (on week 1)
 Eliminated or not in house
 Last person eliminated (at the finale) via public voting
 Valid vote cast
 Vote not revealed
 B$250,000 winner (among the finalists)
 Lost arrive at ranch weigh-in, was automatically eliminated

Notes
On week 1, no elimination but 3 contestants from each team have been sent to Biggest Loser Campus

External links
 Brunei's Biggest Loser official Twitter account.

Mass media in Brunei
Brunei 2
2011 Bruneian television seasons
2012 Bruneian television seasons